"Too Much Mustard" or "Tres Moutarde" is a turkey trot composed by Cecil Macklin in 1911. it was a hit on both sides of the Atlantic in the early 20th century, and continues to be performed often. The song was also often performed as early jazz. Performers included Prince's Band, Victor Military Band, Joe "Fingers" Car, Paul Whiteman and Teresa Brewer.

References

20th-century songs
1911 compositions